Nußbach is a town in the district of Kirchdorf an der Krems in the Austrian state of Upper Austria.

Geography
Nußbach lies in the Traunviertel. About 21 percent of the municipality is forest, and 69 percent is farmland.

References

Cities and towns in Kirchdorf an der Krems District